The 2008–09 Valparaiso Crusaders men's basketball team was an NCAA Division I college basketball team competing in the Horizon League.

Coaching staff
 Homer Drew – Head coach
 Bryce Drew – Associate head coach
 Luke Gore – Assistant coach
 Chris Sparks – Assistant coach
 Pawel Mrozik – Director of Basketball Operations

Roster

Schedule

|-
!colspan=9 style=| Exhibition

|-
!colspan=9 style=| Regular season

|-
!colspan=9 style=| Horizon League tournament

References

Valparaiso Crusaders
Valparaiso Beacons men's basketball seasons
Valp
Valp